The Tour of Ukraine is a stage road cycling race held annually since 2016. It is part of UCI Europe Tour in category 2.2.

Winners

References

UCI Europe Tour races
Recurring sporting events established in 2016
2016 establishments in Ukraine
Cycle races in Ukraine
Sport in Kyiv Oblast